Casterton may refer to one of the following locations:

Australia
Casterton, Victoria

United Kingdom
Casterton, Cumbria
Great Casterton, Rutland
Little Casterton, Rutland